Make You Happy (also known as Make You Happy 1981-1993 (Hits, Rarities & Essential Moments of an Incendiary Australian Band)) is a compilation album by Australian rock band Divinyls, which was released on 21 October 1997. It consists of material spanning from 1981 to 1993 including the hits "Boys in Town", "Science Fiction", "Pleasure and Pain" and their number-one signature song "I Touch Myself". The album's name comes from "I'll Make You Happy", the B-side of "Science Fiction" and a cover version of the 1960s track by The Easybeats. Track 20, "Love in Motion", is a 1992 rerecording of Icehouse's 1981 single with Divinyls' Christina Amphlett featuring on co-lead vocals.

Despite being released in 1997, this compilation did not include recordings from the band's 1996 album Underworld.

Track listing

Charts

References

1997 compilation albums
Divinyls compilation albums
Chrysalis Records compilation albums